Jelena Muhhina (born 22 October 1988) is an Estonian former competitive figure skater. She is the 2006 Estonian national champion and placed 21st in the qualifying round at the 2006 World Championships. After missing the 2008 Estonian Championships due to injury, she did not return to competition.

Muhhina is the elder sister of Sergei Muhhin, who also competed internationally in figure skating.

Programs

Competitive highlights
JGP: Junior Grand Prix

References

External links

 

Estonian female single skaters
Living people
1988 births
Figure skaters from Tallinn
Estonian people of Russian descent